HTMS Maeklong is a retired Royal Thai Navy escort vessel (classified also as a corvette or sloop) and training ship, built at the Uraga Dock in Yokosuka, Japan.

The Maeklong is preserved in concrete in Chulachomklao Fort in Phra Samut Chedi District, Samut Prakan Province, Thailand. The ship is named after a river, the Mae Klong.

Construction and commissioning
HTMS Maeklong construction along with four other warships was ordered and signed by the Royal Thai Navy on 13 August 1935 and Phra Prakobkollakij was assigned as the general overseer of all the five warships, where Luang Chanchakrakij was to overseer the detailed construction of HTMS Maeklong and HTMS Tachin.

Royal keel-laying ceremony for HTMS Maeklong was held on 24 July 1936, at the Uraga Dock Company, Japan. HTMS Maeklong has delivery and returned to Thailand on 10 June 1937 and arrived at Ratcha Woradit Pier on 26 September 1937. The Ministry of Defense organized a welcoming ceremony and enrolled in the ship on the day the ship arrived in Thailand. At the ceremony Prince Oscar Anuvatana, President of the regency council of King Rama VIII, presided over the ceremony at the Rajakij Winitchai Pavilion. HTMS Maeklong commissioned in 1937, served as a training ship for naval officers until the age of 60 is considered the longest active warship in the history of the Thai navy and the second longest in the world.

Service history
During World War II, HTMS Maeklong patrolled the Thai territories to protect the Gulf of Thailand until the war was over and used to be a royal ship in many times, for example, when King Rama VIII went to study in Switzerland on 13 January 1938, or when the King returned to Bangkok on 2 December 1951 and used in royal proceedings to inspect the Naval Parade and Observing the landing of the marines at Bang Saen Beach, Chon Buri Province on 20 November 1954. In addition, it was organized as a ship to bring bone ash of King Prajadhipok to Tha Ratchaworadit on 20 May 1949.

HTMS Maeklong Museum
Later, King Bhumibol Adulyadej asked the Royal Thai Navy that should preserve the old warships and make them into a museum of military history to disseminate knowledge to the public. Therefore, in the auspicious occasion of King Bhumibol will ascend the throne for the 50th year in 1996, the Royal Thai Navy built the Thai Warship Museum in honor of the Golden Jubilee Year of King Bhumibol by conserving the Mae Klong Luang boat and creating a warship museum in the navy's outdoor museum project.

Gallery

References

 Gardiner, Robert and Roger Chesneau. Conway's All The World's Fighting Ships 1922–1946. London: Conway Maritime Press, 1980. .
 Mikesh, Robert C. and Shorzoe Abe. Japanese Aircraft 1910–1941. London: Putnam, 1990. .

External links 
HTMS Maeklong Conservation Project

Museum ships in Thailand
Ships of the Royal Thai Navy
1936 ships
Buildings and structures in Samut Prakan province
Tourist attractions in Samut Prakan province
Ships built by Uraga Dock Company
Japan–Thailand military relations
Royal and presidential yachts
World War II frigates